The K7205/7206 Harbin-Baoqing Through Train is Chinese railway running between Harbin to Baoqing County express passenger trains by the Harbin Railway Bureau, Harbin passenger segment responsible for passenger transport task, Habin originating on the Baoqing Count train. 25G Type Passenger trains running along the Binbei Railway, Suijia Railway, Jiafu Railway, Fuqian Railway and Youbao Railway across Heilongjiang provinces, the entire 689 km. Harbin East Railway Station to Baoqing Railway Station running 12 hours and 54 minutes, use trips for K7205; Baoqing Railway Station to Harbin Railway Station to run 12 hours, use trips for K7206.

References 

Passenger rail transport in China
Rail transport in Heilongjiang